Marvelous Marterie  is a studio album released by Ralph Marterie and his Marlboro Men in 1959 on Wing LP record MGW 12154 (mono) and SRW 12511 (stereo).

Background
This album was in Mercury’s budget Wing line.  It was recorded between December 1956 and April 1959.  Most of the individual recordings were never otherwise released by Mercury, although “When My Sugar Walks Down the Street” was also released on Mercury 45rpm #71488, and “Trombone Blues” was also released under the title “Private Eyeball” on the full-priced LP Music For A Private Eye (Mercury MG 20437, SR 60109)

Track listing 
 Somebody Loves Me (Gershwin – DeSylva – Macdonald)
 Can't We Be Friends? (Swift - James)
 Deep Purple (Peter DeRose)
 Lonely Winter (arr. George Stone)
 Trombone Blues (S. Allen – R. Marterie)
 When My Sugar Walks Down the Street (Irving Mills – Jimmy McHugh – Gene Austin)
 Rain (Eugene Ford)
 Stars Fell on Alabama (Frank Perkins – Mitchell Parish)
 Sentimental Journey (Les Brown – Ben Homer – Bud Green)
 I’ll Be Around (Alec Wilder)
 Love Song from “Houseboat” (J. Livingston – Ray Evans)

References

1959 albums
Wing Records albums
Big band albums